Naskh (from the verb , , 'to copy', from n-s-kh root (ن-س-خ)) is a smaller, round script of Islamic calligraphy. Naskh is one of the first scripts of Islamic calligraphy to develop, commonly used in writing administrative documents and for transcribing books, including the Qur’an, because of its easy legibility.

In his 1617 Grammatica Arabica, Thomas van Erpe defined naskhī characters as the "noblest and true writing style".

Origin 
Naskh style of writing can be found as early as within the first century of the Islamic calendar.

Round scripts became the most popular in the eleventh, twelfth and thirteenth centuries, due to their use by scribes.

These are known as "the proportioned scripts" or "the six scripts".

Kufic is commonly believed to predate naskh, but historians have traced the two scripts as coexisting long before their codification by ibn Muqla, as the two served different purposes. Kufi was used primarily in decoration, while Naskh served for everyday scribal use.

Description 
The alif is written as a straight stroke, bending to the lower left. Naskh differentiates various sounds through the use of diacritical points, in the form of 1–3 dots above or below the letter, which makes the script more easily legible. Naskh uses a horizontal base line; in situations where one character starts within the tail of the preceding letter, the base line is broken and raised. In sixteenth-century Constantinople, Şeyh Hamdullah (1429–1520) redesigned the structure of naskh, along with the other "Six Pens", in order to make the script appear more precise and less heavy.

Use 
The script is what is normally used electronically and as the default typeface. Examples on typefaces in naskh on Windows (W), iOS (M), Linux (L), and Google Fonts (G):
 Arial(W/M) (Arabic Transparent,(W) Times New Roman)(W/M)
 Simplified Arabic(W)
 Courier New(W/M) (monospace)
 Damascus(M)
 Noto Naskh Arabic(G)
 SF Arabic(M)

Naskh was historically used heavily in the transcription of books and in administrative courtly documents.

Naskh allowed for the development of decorative elements into more supple, rounded designs, away from the common use of squared kufic in decoration. Naskh's use in architecture first began in the tenth century and had been adopted in many Muslim countries by the eleventh century.

Mixed use with Ruqʿah style 
 KacstOne(L)
 Arabic Typesetting(W)
 Al Bayan(M)
 DecoType Naskh(M)
 Baghdad(M)
 Geeza Pro(M)
 Nadeem(M)
 Sakkal Majalla(W)
 Traditional Arabic(W)
 Amiri(G)

More recently, fonts, such as the Bulaq Press-inspired Amiri typeface or Monotype Imaging's Bustani font, have created user-friendly digital manifestations of naskh for use in graphic design and digital typography, mixed with Ruqʿah.

Gallery

See also 
Ruqʿah (the cursive Arabic handwriting)
Nastaliq
Arabic, Urdu, other Arabic keyboard layouts
National Language Authority
Taʿlīq script

References

External links

Arabic calligraphy
Islamic calligraphy
Pashto